The Shallows can refer to:

 The Shallows (book), a 2010 non-fiction book by Nicholas G. Carr
 The Shallows (film), a 2016 thriller film starring Blake Lively
Music 
 The Shallows (album), a 2012 album by I Like Trains
 "The Shallows", a song performed by Dog's Eye View on the 1997 album Daisy
 "The Shallows", a song performed by Bear Hands on the 2016 album You'll Pay for This